The 1892 Chertsey by-election was a parliamentary by-election held on 3 March 1892 for the British House of Commons constituency of Chertsey. It was caused by the death of the constituency's sitting Conservative Member of Parliament Frederick Alers Hankey, who had held the seat since the 1885 general election.

Result

The seat was held for the Conservatives by Charles Harvey Combe of Cobham Park.

References

1892 elections in the United Kingdom
1892 in England
By-elections to the Parliament of the United Kingdom in Surrey constituencies
19th century in Surrey